Ian Cockerline (born February 22, 1984) is a Canadian luger who competed internationally from 2000 to 2010, and competed in two Winter Olympics. While he crashed on his fourth and final run of the 2006 Winter Olympics in Turin, he continued to earn his best Olympic finish of 20th in the men's singles event at Vancouver in 2010. He is now retired from the competition. He loves to mountain bike, ski and is scared of height.

Cockerline's best finish at the FIL World Luge Championships was 15th in the men's singles event at Oberhof, Germany in 2008.

Away from luge, Cockerline resides in Red Deer, Alberta.

References
 FIL-Luge results
 
 Canoe.ca profile
 FIL-Luge profile
 
 
Ian Cockerline | Canadian Athletes Now

External links 
 
 
 
 

1984 births
Living people
Canadian male lugers
Olympic lugers of Canada
Lugers at the 2006 Winter Olympics
Lugers at the 2010 Winter Olympics